Elena Andreicheva is a Ukrainian-born producer and filmmaker. She moved to the United Kingdom at the age of 11, and later studied physics at Imperial College London, graduating with a Bachelor of Science and then a Masters in Science Communication. She worked in TV film production beginning in 2006.

She is the producer of the 2019 documentary film Learning to Skateboard in a Warzone (If You're a Girl), for which she and Carol Dysinger won the (Oscar) Academy Award for Best Documentary Short Subject at the 92nd Academy Awards. Her Oscar outfit was made sustainably and she related that to her work "dealing with inequality and injustice". She spoke at the Athens Science Festival in 2021 on how documentary film can help people understand science and technology. She was assistant director to Rebecca Marshall on a documentary titled The Forest in Me. The film was shot in Siberia and followed seventy-year old Agafia Lykova, a woman living a two weeks walk away from the nearest person, virtually a recluse from the Stalin era. She also helped fact check for Nick Rosen's book How to Live Off-Grid.

On winning the Oscar, Andreicheva became the first female winner of Ukrainian origin since the country gained independence.

Awards

References

External links
 Official website
 Interview about her career choices
 Interview about Oscar and Ukraine

Year of birth missing (living people)
Living people
British women film producers
British women film directors
Producers who won the Best Documentary Short Subject Academy Award
Ukrainian women film directors